Didrimys harmonica is a moth of the family Tortricidae first described by Edward Meyrick in 1905. It is found in Sri Lanka, Java, Borneo and New Guinea.

Larval food plants are Eugenia subglauca, Eugenia polyantha and Psidium guajava.

References

Moths of Asia
Moths described in 1905